Demis Cosmin Grigoraș (born 30 June 1993) is a Romanian handball player who plays for S.L. Benfica and the Romania national team.

Achievements
Nemzeti Bajnokság I:  
Bronze Medalist: 2017, 2018
Liga Națională: 
Bronze Medalist: 2016
World University Championship:
Gold Medalist: 2016
Benfica
EHF European League: 2021–22

Individual awards 
 World University Championship Top Scorer:  2016

References

1993 births
Living people
Sportspeople from Vaslui
Romanian male handball players
Romanian expatriate sportspeople in Hungary
Romanian expatriate sportspeople in France
Expatriate handball players